Vlado Badžim (born 21 October 1964) is a Slovenian football manager and former player who was most recently the manager of NK Brda.

Honours

Manager 
Koper
Slovenian Cup: 2006–07

References

External links
Profile at PrvaLiga 

1964 births
Living people
Sportspeople from Koper
Slovenian footballers
Slovenian football managers
FC Koper players
Slovenian PrvaLiga players
NK Domžale managers
Association footballers not categorized by position